Lewis Ludlow Gould (born September 21, 1939) is an American historian and author. He is Eugene C. Barker Centennial Professor Emeritus in American History at the University of Texas at Austin. He is a specialist on 20th century American political history, the history of the Republican Party, and presidential administrations since 1896. He pioneered the scholarly study of presidential spouses.

Education and career
Gould was born September 21, 1939, in New York City. His father Jack Gould was television critic of The New York Times from 1947 to 1972. He took his A.B. from Brown University, in 1961, and his PhD in history from Yale University, in 1966. Howard R. Lamar directed his dissertation. He was an instructor and assistant professor at Yale, 1965-1967, then spent his career at the University of Texas at Austin. He became full professor in 1976 and was Eugene C. Barker Centennial Professor of American history, 1983-98. He chaired the History Department, 1980-84. He became professor emeritus in 1998. He was a visiting professor at Monmouth College. He married medievalist Karen D. Keel in 1970; she died in 2012. In May 2016 he married Jeanne Gittings Robeson. They live in Monmouth, Illinois.

His awards include National Endowment for the Humanities fellowship (1974), and Carr P. Collins Prize from the Texas Institute of Letters in 1974.

Gould in 1982 developed the nation's first course on presidential spouses. His research on Lady Bird Johnson demonstrated her impact on the environmental movement.  In 1998 he launched a book series on "Modern First Ladies" for the University Press of Kansas. That led to his books: Lady Bird Johnson: Our Environmental First Lady (1999), Helen Taft: Our Musical First Lady (2010) and Edith Kermit Roosevelt: Creating the Modern First Lady (2012).  In 2021 the First Ladies Association for Research and Education (FLARE) established an annual prize named after Gould in recognition of his pioneering scholarship on the historical role of First Ladies. Gould was also the first winner.

Evaluations
Presidential Studies Quarterly stated in 2011: "Gould, the preeminent political historian of the Progressive Era, contributes new, original research and a provocative reinterpretation in Four Hats in the Ring, which is based on insights from his 40 years of research into the period."

The Journal of American History stated regarding the President Taft book: "The result is a balanced, fair assessment of the twenty-seventh president that will prove to be particularly valuable to those studying the early twentieth century. This study was long overdue....Gould's insight, conclusions, and presentation are all quite strong....[It] will prove to be the first volume that scholars who want to learn more
about Taft will consult for years to come."

Bibliography
 The First Modern Clash over Federal Power: Wilson versus Hughes in the Presidential Election of 1916 (UP of Kansas, 2016) online
 Chief Executive to Chief Justice: Taft Betwixt the White House and Supreme Court (UP Kansas, 2014) online
 Edith Kermit Roosevelt: Creating the Modern First Lady (2012) online
 Helen Taft: Our Musical First Lady (UP Kansas, 2010)
 Four Hats in the Ring: The 1912 Election and the Birth of Modern American Politics (2009) online
 The William Howard Taft Presidency (UP Kansas, 2009)
 The Modern American Presidency (2nd ed. UP of Kansas, 2009) online
 Editor, Bull Moose on the Stump: The 1912 Campaign Speeches of Theodore Roosevelt (UP of Kansas, 2008).
 Grand Old Party: A History of the Republicans (Random House, 2007). online
 The Republicans: A History of the Grand Old Party (Oxford UP, 2nd ed. 2014)
 The Most Exclusive Club: A History of the Modern United States Senate (2005)
 Alexander Watkins Terrell (U of Texas Press, 2004). online
 Editor, Watching Television Come of Age: The New York Times Reviews by Jack Gould (U. of Texas Press, 2002).
 "Howard Roberts Lamar" in Clio's Favorites: Leading Historians of the United States, 1945–2000 ed. by Robert Allen Rutland. (Columbia: University of Missouri Press, 2000) pp. 84-97.
 With Melissa R. Sneed. “Without Pride or Apology: The University of Texas at Austin, Racial Integration, and the Barbara Smith Case.” The Southwestern Historical Quarterly (1999) 103#1 pp. 66–87.  online
 Lady Bird Johnson: Our Environmental First Lady (UP of Kansas, 1999).
 With Nancy Beck Young. Texas, Her Texas: The Life and Times of Frances Goff (Texas State Historical Association, 1997).
 Editor, American First Ladies: Their Lives and Their Legacy(Garland, 1996; 2nd ed. Routledge, 2001).
 1968: The Election That Changed America (Ivan R. Dee, 1993).
 The Presidency of Theodore Roosevelt (UP Kansas, 1991).
 With Craig H. Roell. William McKinley: A Bibliography (Meckler, 1988).
 Lady Bird Johnson and the Environment (UP Kansas, 1988) online
  The Spanish–American War and President McKinley (University Press of Kansas, 1982). online
 The Presidency of William McKinley (UP Kansas, 1980).
 Reform and Regulation: American Politics, 1900-1916 (Wiley 1978 and two later editions).
 Progressives and Prohibitionists: Texas Democrats in the Wilson Era (U. of Texas Press, 1973)
 "New Perspectives on the Republican Party, 1877–1913," American Historical Review (1972) 77#4 pp. 1074-1082 online
 Edited with James C. Curtis. The Black Experience in America: Selected Essays.  (U of Texas Press, 1970) online
 Wyoming: A Political History, 1868–1896 (Yale UP, 1968) online review
 "A. S. Mercer and the Johnson County War: A Reappraisal." Arizona and the West 7.1 (1965): 5-20.

See also
 History of the Republican Party (United States)
 First Lady of the United States

References

Further reading
 Coates, Benjamin. "Reconsidering the Tafts" H-Net Reviews in the Humanities & Social Sciences (Sept 2011), pp. 1-5.  online
 "Lewis Gould Honored as Inaugural Recipient of FLARE Award" (July 26, 2021, Briscoe Center for American History) online
 McNamara, Barry. "Pioneer Historian Retired Monmouth professor Lewis Gould receives inaugural award from first ladies association," Monmouth College July 07, 2021 online

External links
 

Living people
1939 births
Historians from New York (state)
Historians of the United States
Yale University alumni